Pseudometachilo delius is a moth in the family Crambidae. It was described by Stanisław Błeszyński in 1966. It is found in Paraná, Brazil.

References

Moths described in 1966